The International Staff Band  (or ISB) is the premier brass band of The Salvation Army.

History
The Salvation Army history generally acknowledges 7 October 1891, the date on which Commissioner Bramwell Booth brought the 'International Headquarters Staff Band' into being, as the official starting point for the ISB's existence.  The International Staff Band is a brass band based at The Salvation Army’s UK Headquarters in London and it exists to promote the highest standards of Salvation Army banding and to spread the message of the Christian gospel through its musical ministry.

The band
All bandsmen and women are actively involved in their local Salvation Army Corps, many holding leadership positions. They give their time freely to this additional ministry.  The members of the band are drawn from Salvation Army centres as far afield as Kettering, Manchester, Bristol, Norwich and Birmingham. While based in the UK, the band has an international reputation and ministry, undertaking regular overseas tours.

Schedule
The International Staff Band makes monthly visits to Salvation Army centres around the UK, presenting musical concerts and leading worship and open-air meetings. On a normal weekend Corps visit, the band will present a concert on a Saturday evening, lead the Sunday worship meetings, and sometimes present a further concert at the local Salvation Army Church on Sunday afternoon. The band also participates in most major Salvation Army events held in venues including London's Royal Albert Hall, Wembley Conference Centre and Royal Festival Hall. It is featured frequently in national television and radio broadcasts including BBC Songs of Praise, Radio 2’s Sunday Half Hour, Listen to the Band and GMTV.

In addition to their activities in the UK, the International Staff Band tours abroad regularly - recent trips have included America, Switzerland, Canada, Australia, New Zealand and Japan.   The band has released numerous CDs of Salvation Army music, including a collaboration with Black Dyke Band to produce a double CD recording of the published works of Wilfred Heaton (The Heaton Collection). This recording has received critical acclaim from the brass band world's leading publications, several of which selected it as their CD of the Year in 2002. They released 'The Kingdom Triumphant' in June 2003 and also produced a compilation recording of music by Eric Ball to mark the centenary of his birth in October 2003. They travelled to North America in March 2004 for a two-week tour that included visits to Toronto, New York City and Chicago and again in 2010 for a ten-day tour that included visits to Los Angeles, Phoenix, Las Vegas, Sacramento and Seattle.

In recent years, the ISB has also represented Salvation Army bands at the National Brass Band Championships’ Gala Concerts in the Royal Albert Hall, London, as well as at other significant brass banding occasions.   These occasions have seen them sharing the platform with groups such as Black Dyke Band, Symphonic Brass of London and the Don Lusher Big Band.  In October 2003, they represented The Salvation Army in a special concert to commemorate the centenary of the birth of Eric Ball.  SP&S have released a DVD of this concert, which also featured Black Dyke Band.

The International Staff Band is led by Dr Stephen Cobb, who is also the Salvation Army's Music Director for the United Kingdom Territory with the Republic of Ireland.

In June 2011, the band celebrated its 120th anniversary with a weekend of events in London. The centrepiece was a day-long brass extravaganza in the Royal Albert Hall on Saturday 4 June to which all eight Salvation Army staff bands of the world took part.

Recordings
In 2008, The Salvation Army signed an exclusive deal with Universal Music. The band recorded the album, Together, which went on sale on 24 November and entered at number 20 in the UK album charts.

The International Staff Band has made many recordings.

CD recordings include:
Heritage Series Vol. 4 - Music from the 1960s (2012)
Fire in the Blood (2012)
From the Heart (2012)
Heritage Series Vol. 3 - Music from the 1950s (2011)
Heritage Series Vol. 2 - Music from the 1940s (2010)
Seize the Day (2010)
So Glad! (2010)
The Peter Graham Collection (2009)
Heritage Series Vol. 1 - Music from the 1930s (2009)
Daystar (2008)
Supremacy (2007)
Christmas Tidings (2006)
St Magnus (2006)
Origins (2005)
Jubilee (2004)
The Kingdom Triumphant (2003)
Glory Glory (2001)
Renaissance (2000)
Odyssey (1998)
Manuscripts (1997)
Partita (1996)
Trumpet Call (1995)
A Fanfare of Praise (1994)
Blazon (1991)
Perspectives (1990)
The King's Crusader (1989)
Goldcrest (1988)

A series of DVDs have been published.

Music in the form of online downloads is also available on the Apple iTunes Music store. and music download service Google Play

See also
Salvation Army Band
Hendon Band of The Salvation Army
Household Troops Band
Maidenhead Citadel Band
Chalk Farm Salvation Army Band
Melbourne Staff Band
PSA Brass Band

References

External links
 International Staff Band

The Salvation Army
Salvation Army brass bands
British brass bands
Salvationism in the United Kingdom